John Lennard is an academic and writer.

John Lennard may also refer to:

John Lennard of the Lennard Baronets

See also
Jack Lennard, soccer player
John Lennard-Jones, mathematician
John Leonard (disambiguation)